Kobenni or Kobeni is a town and commune in southern Mauritania, in Northwest Africa, as is the administrative headquarters of Kobenni Department. Population is the 2013 census was 11,833. The town is 257 km² and mostly agricultural and urban-commune.

See also
Departments of Mauritania
Kobenni (department)

References

Hodh El Gharbi Region
Communes of Mauritania